Gunterstein Castle (Dutch: Gunterstein) is a castle in Breukelen, on the river Vecht, that was the former home of the rich Dutch widow Magdalena Poulle (1626–1699). She bought the property and associated title after the former castle and stronghold was destroyed by the French in the Disaster Year Rampjaar 1672.

History
The castle was built in 1681 on the foundations of an earlier castle, by the architect Adriaan Dortsman (who also designed the new Lutheran church in Amsterdam. The castle grounds had been home to two previous constructions; a 14th-century castle named after Gysbrecht Gunter was destroyed in 1511. After being rebuilt by Gunter descendants, it changed hands several times and belonged for a short time to Johan van Oldenbarnevelt until he was beheaded in 1619. That building was later burned by the French in 1672 along with nearby Castle Nijenrode.

The wealthy Amsterdam widow Magdalena Poulle bought the castle in 1680 and called herself Lady Gunterstein from then onwards. It is her family shield which is displayed above the windows. She planned to leave the house to her nephew Pieter and had him lay the first stone at age three. Her portrait was made also showing her nephew holding Dortsman's groundplan by the Amsterdam portrait painter David van der Plas, himself the son-in-law of the architect. This portrait still hangs above the mantelpiece where it was installed in 1683.

Magdalena Poulle became an avid gardener and amateur botanist commissioning a book of etchings called Veues de Gunterstein (Views of Gunterstein), dedicated to Madame de Gunterstein et de Thienhoven. This book contains one of the earliest pictures of a Dutch orangerie with hothouses, and was highly influential on later botanists and wealthy garden owners such as Agnes Block and George Clifford III, who also sought to grow unusual plants and record them in albums.

Today, Gunterstein is still home to descendants of Magdalena Poulle. The surrounding park which is open to the public, is protected as a rijksmonument, as well as all of the older structures around it.

Gallery

See also 

 List of castles in the Netherlands
 Buitenplaats

References

External links 

 Gunterstein on the Stichtse Vecht website

Parks in Utrecht (province)
Castles in Utrecht (province)
Rijksmonuments in Utrecht (province)
Buildings and structures in Stichtse Vecht